The Cozmeni is a left tributary of the river Fișag in Romania. It discharges into the Fișag near Cetățuia.

References

Rivers of Romania
Rivers of Harghita County